Oak Grove, also known as Rolyat, is an unincorporated community in Bowie County, Texas. According to the Handbook of Texas, the community had a population of 294 in 2000. It is located within the Texarkana metropolitan area.

History
A post office was opened in 1893 under the name Rolyat but changed to Oak Grove in 1906 due to the oak trees nearby. 200 people were living in the community in 1914 but then plunged to 80 in 1925. The post office closed in the 1950s. Its population was 60 in 1982 and had no businesses. In 2000, 294 residents lived in Oak Grove.

Geography

Education
Oak Grove is served by the New Boston Independent School District.

References

Unincorporated communities in Bowie County, Texas
Unincorporated communities in Texas